The Edward Penniman House and Barn is a historic site in Eastham, Massachusetts, on Fort Hill, which is currently protected by the Cape Cod National Seashore and home to Indian Rock.

The house was built in 1868 and added to the National Register of Historic Places in 1976.

History
The house was built by Edward Penniman (1831–1913). When Edward Penniman was growing up, it was possible to catch whales directly from the seashore, a practice the Indians perfected using the shallow marsh waters to scare herds of blackfish onto the beaches. Attracted by the profits to be made as a whaler, he ran to sea at age eleven and at 29 he was master of his own whaling ship. He took his wife with him on his travels, and the addition of 3 children to his household did not deter him from trips lasting up to four years. His youngest daughter suffered from seasickness and was sent to live with an aunt. It is the family correspondence with this daughter that makes the Penniman house so interesting, as it brings the daily life of a whaling captain into perspective.

On retirement in 1868, Captain Penniman built this unusual house with plans he designed himself, including a modern toilet and bath with hot running water. From the cupola he would watch his extended family play in the surrounding fields, while on the lookout for ships. His daughter took many pictures of impromptu family gatherings, including a picture of her mother in pants.

Irma Knowles Penniman Broun sold the Penniman estate to the Cape Cod National Seashore.

National Park Service
The house is now on the Fort Hill Trail, which is kept up by the National Park Service.

See also
National Register of Historic Places listings in Cape Cod National Seashore
National Register of Historic Places listings in Barnstable County, Massachusetts

References

 Fort Hill Trail map and guide 
 Teaching with Historic Places entry for Penniman house 

Barns on the National Register of Historic Places in Massachusetts
National Register of Historic Places in Cape Cod National Seashore
Eastham, Massachusetts
Houses completed in 1867
Houses in Barnstable County, Massachusetts
Houses on the National Register of Historic Places in Barnstable County, Massachusetts
Second Empire architecture in Massachusetts